Monsignor Thomas Maher (25 April 1922 – 25 March 2015) was an Irish Catholic priest and Irish Hurler who played as left wing-forward for the Kilkenny senior team.

Born in Gowran, County Kilkenny, Maher first played competitive hurling during his schooling at St. Kieran's College. He arrived on the inter-county scene at the age of twenty-three when he first linked up with the Kilkenny senior team. He made his senior debut during the 1945 championship. Maher had a brief inter-county career and won one Leinster medal as a non-playing substitute. He was an All-Ireland runner-up on one occasion.

At club level Maher had a brief career with Castle Rovers and Thomastown.

In retirement from playing Maher became involved in team management and coaching. As trainer and coach of the Kilkenny senior team for over twenty years he guided the team to seven All-Ireland titles, fourteen Leinster titles and three National Hurling League titles. Maher also found much success at club level with Mullinavat and at colleges' level with St. Kieran's College.

Honours

Player

St. Kieran's College
Leinster Colleges Senior Hurling Championship (3): 1939, 1940, 1941

Kilkenny
Leinster Senior Hurling Championship (1): 1946 (sub)

Leinster
All-Ireland Colleges Senior Hurling Inter-Provincial Championship (1): 1940

Trainer

Mullinavat
Kilkenny Junior Hurling Championship (1): 1984

Kilkenny
All-Ireland Senior Hurling Championship (7): 1957, 1963, 1967, 1969, 1972, 1974, 1975

Clerical career
Monsignor Maher studied for the priesthood in Maynooth College and was ordained a Catholic priest  for the Diocese of Ossory in 1948, worked as a curate in Dublin before moving back to Kilkenny in 1955 and taught Mathematics, Physics and Chemistry at St Kieran's College, Kilkenny, from 1963, and served as President of St Kieran’s College from 1973 to 1983. He left St Kieran’s to become parish priest of Mullinavat in South Kilkenny where he remained until he retired in 1998. He awarded the church title of Monsignor from the Catholic church.

References

1922 births
2015 deaths
Thomastown hurlers
Kilkenny inter-county hurlers
Leinster inter-provincial hurlers
Kilkenny hurling managers
20th-century Irish Roman Catholic priests
Alumni of St Patrick's College, Maynooth
21st-century Irish Roman Catholic priests